Majagual may refer to:

Majagual, Dominican Republic, a town in Monte Plata province, Dominican Republic
Majagual, Sucre, in Sucre department, Colombia